John Brooks (1783 – September 10, 1813) was an officer in the United States Marine Corps during the War of 1812. He was the son of later Governor of Massachusetts John Brooks

Biography
Born in Brookfield, Massachusetts, Brooks was appointed a 2nd Lieutenant, October 1, 1807. He commanded the detachment of Marines on Commodore Oliver Hazard Perry's flagship, .

He was killed in action during the Battle of Lake Erie on September 10, 1813.

Concurrent with the issuance of Congressional Gold Medals to Commodore Perry and Jesse Elliott, Congress awarded Silver Medals (modeled on the Perry medal) to each commissioned officer and one to the nearest male relative of Lt. John Brooks Jr. of the U.S. Marine Corps, who was killed in the engagement.

The destroyer , launched in 1919, was named for him.

References

External links
Altoff, Gerard T.  War Of 1812: Leathernecks On Lake Erie - Originally published in the November 1988.  Marine Corps Gazette.

1783 births
1813 deaths
People from Brookfield, Massachusetts
United States Marine Corps officers
American military personnel killed in the War of 1812
Military personnel from Massachusetts